Lake Clearwater is in the Ashburton District of the South Island of New Zealand. The outlet feeds into the south branch of the Ashburton River / Hakatere. Located in the upper reaches of the Rangitata River a small village of holiday homes, also called Lake Clearwater, is located between Lake Clearwater and the smaller neighbour Lake Camp.

The lake borders, and is proposed to be included in, the Hakatere Conservation Park which covers nearly 60,000 hectares of rugged mountain country, tussocklands, beech forest and sparkling clear rivers and lakes between the Rakaia and Rangitata Rivers. The lake has a submerged plant indicator rating of 48 (moderate). It is subjected to the strong prevailing northwesterly winds.

Road access to Lake Clearwater is approximately 38 km past Mount Somers and the last half is an unsealed gravel road. No dogs or motor powered craft are permitted on the lake as it is a wildlife reserve, however strong and consistent winds funnelled off the bounding mountains make it an ideal lake for windsurfing and kitesurfing. The adjacent, and smaller, Lake Camp is used by motor powered water craft.

The lake is a breeding site for the Great crested grebe.

References

Clearwater